Tracey McBean is an Australian animated children's television series produced by Southern Star Entertainment and Film Australia. The show was aired from 2001 until 2006 on ABC Kids.

Overview 
The main protagonist, Tracey, is a young nine-year-old girl who goes to school with her best friend Shamus. Together they use Tracey's inventions for all kinds of purposes, such as school competitions or simply for fun. Tracey lives in a house and Shamus on the 15th floor of a tall apartment building. Shamus loves gardening organically and Tracey likes inventing devices and contraptions. Tracey uses a caravan in her backyard for inventing. The caravan, white with a horizontal thick red stripe, has an antenna, and a computer and many devices and parts within. Tracey's younger sister, Megan, often annoys Tracey to the extent that she will invent something to stop this annoyance. The antagonists are the McConnolly brothers, who go to Tracey's school. They often are rivals of McBean though lacking much intelligence and often are either culprits or annoy Tracey and Shamus is some manner. Jim McConnolly is the leader, who is even powerful enough to use as a weapon or tool to add food or other items from fellow students. Jake McConnolly is the obese and usually dim-witted brother who sometimes displays an odd amount of intelligence, but only briefly for an amusing value. McBeans' arch-rival, with equal or lower intelligence, though less morals, is Laszlo, a boy science club member. In most episodes, Tracey invents a device to help her or her friends and family in a situation with good intention but this leads to a minor disaster or failure and she must work out a solution. Although based on her abilities in science and her technical knowledge the show rarely features any scientific basis for her inventions and many take on a fantastic amount of power or extremely exaggerated function.

Characters

Main 
Tracey McBean: (voiced by Roslyn Oades) is the titular character 
 Shamus Wong: Tracey's best friend
 Jim and Jake: The two brothers who bully Tracey.

Minor 
Megan McBean: Tracey's younger sister
 Mr. & Mrs. McBean: Tracey's parents
 Gordon McBean: Tracey's brother.
 Laszlo: Tracey's rival.
 Morris and Sandy: Tracey's pets.
 Mrs Carmody: Tracey's teacher.
 Mr Longbottom: The school principal.
 Shamus family: He has three older brothers with a father and mother.
Lee: The boy who is rejected as bad luck but Tracey tries to help Lee. He appears in "Bad Luck Lee".
Linda: The well-known player when Tracey tries to get  her to join the pane. Linda appears in some episodes.
Jimmy McConnelly: Jim and Jack's cousin. She appears in "The McConnelly Cousin".
Robot Tracey: the robot was invented by herself.
The robot family: the robot family was invented by herself. 
Mr. Arther: Tracey's uncle and the inventor. 
Harvey: Shamus's friend
Jackson: He was Tracey's grandson in the future. He appears in "Tracey in 2060" Episode.

Episodes

Season 1 
 "Stretching Machine" & "Family Power"
 "Gordon the King" & "Lost Thing Finder"
 "Mom's Birthday" & "Multiplication"
 "Pocket Money" & "School Camp"
 "Brain Machine" & "Local Weather"
 "Stage Fright" & "Park Monster"
 "Invisible Megan" & "The Great Race"
 "Fancy Dress" & "Rainbow"
 "Robo Tracey" & "Horsing Around"
 "Zoom Boots" & "Bugs"
 "Finding the Beat" & "Gordon's Bed"
 "Gordon's Makeover" & "Ultimate Jungle Gym"
 "Fallout" & "Freckle Frenzy"

Season 2 
 "Sherlock Tracey" & "Bad Luck Lee"
 "Bald Bob" & "Marble Mania"
 "Election" & "The Vegetable That Cried Wolf"
 "World Record" & "Gentleman Jim"
 "Big Things" & "The McConnelly Cousin"
 "13" & "Anti-Shamus"
 "Teddys" & "Galaxy Blazers"
 "Party On" & "Dirt Magnet"
 "Time Skip" & "Lights, Camera, Action"
 "Surfbuster" & "Zoo Story"
 "Fairy Tales" & "Swap"
 "A Trifling Master" & "On Ice"
 "Overdue" & "Jim In Charge"
 "Go!, Gordon!, Go!" & "Lost Muse"

Season 3 
 "Stuck On You" & "Jurassic Tracey"
 "Jim's Curse" & "Away"
 "Clowning Around" & "Big Nick"
 "Socks" & "To The Top"
 "Boss Tracey" & "Where The Wind Blows Tracey"
 "Rubbish" & "Wild Times"
 "Come Back Kitty" & "Remote Control"
 "Quiz Show" & "Radio Jim"
 "Mystery Girl" & "Of Lice And Tracey"
 "Escape" & "Game On"
 "The Makeover" & "Inner Beauty" 
 "The Snow" & "Tracey and the flying submarine" 
 "The Stone Age" & "The Power Downland machine"
 "The evil Toothbrush" & "Giant Mosquitos" 
 "Anti Shamus Again" & "everyone become babies?"
 "Tracey's washing machine"& "The Superhero Gordon"
 "Tracey's birthday" (15 minutes special episode)

Telecast
The show originally aired on ABC Kids in Australia. Internationally, the show is also aired on Pop in the United Kingdom and Discovery Kids in the U.S.

Awards
2003 Australian Writers' Guild Awgie Award, Children's Television category - winner.
2003 Silver Logie for Most Outstanding Children's Program - winner.
2006 Australian Writers' Guild Awgie Award - winner.

References

External links

 
 Tracey McBean | australianscreen | National Film and Sound Archive | Australia

2001 Australian television series debuts
2006 Australian television series endings
2000s Australian animated television series
Australian children's animated comedy television series
English-language television shows
Australian Broadcasting Corporation original programming
BBC children's television shows
Television series by Endemol Australia
Television shows set in Sydney
Fictional inventors
Animated television series about children